Marc Voorhoeve (5 April 1950, Amsterdam – 7 October 2011, Eindhoven) was a Dutch mathematician who introduced the Voorhoeve index of a complex function in 1976.

Marc studied at the University of Leiden where he wrote a thesis on exponential polynomials.
The Voorhoeve index is a result from this work.

He then worked at Centrum Wiskunde & Informatica and at Philips Data Systems,
a division of Philips that manufactured minicomputers.

From 1985 to 2011, he was assistant professor in Kees van Hee's group at Eindhoven University of Technology, which specialized in business process modeling techniques based on sound mathematical principles, in particular Petri nets and process algebra.

Publications

See also
 Petersen's theorem

References

External links
 Home page at TU/e
 

1950 births
2011 deaths
20th-century Dutch mathematicians
21st-century Dutch mathematicians
Leiden University alumni
Academic staff of the Eindhoven University of Technology
Scientists from Amsterdam